Lophospingus is a small genus of South American birds in the tanager family Thraupidae.

These finches are mostly gray and have prominent upstanding crests. They live in open habitats in southern South America.

Taxonomy and species list
The genus Lophospingus was introduced in 1878 by the German ornithologists Jean Cabanis with the black-crested finch as the type species. The genus name combines the Ancient Greek lophos meaning "crest" and spingos  meaning "finch".

The genus contains two species:

References

 
Taxonomy articles created by Polbot
Bird genera